This is a list of electoral results for the electoral district of Hawthorne in Queensland state elections.

Members for Hawthorne

Election results

Elections in the 1960s

References

Queensland state electoral results by district